Mohamed Betti (born 19 March 1997) is a Dutch professional footballer who plays as a full back.

Club career
He made his professional debut in the Eerste Divisie for FC Volendam on 21 October 2016 in a game against Jong Ajax.

Personal life
Born in the Netherlands, Betti is of Moroccan descent.

References

External links
 

1997 births
Living people
Footballers from Amsterdam
Dutch footballers
Dutch sportspeople of Moroccan descent
FC Volendam players
Eerste Divisie players
Derde Divisie players
Association football defenders